Mary Mallon (September 23, 1869 – November 11, 1938), commonly known as Typhoid Mary, was an Irish-born American cook believed to have infected between 51 and 122 people with typhoid fever. The infections caused three confirmed deaths, with unconfirmed estimates of up to 50. She was the first person in the United States identified as an asymptomatic carrier of the pathogenic bacteria Salmonella typhi.  She persisted in working as a cook and thereby exposed others to the disease.  Because of that, she was twice forcibly quarantined by authorities, eventually for the final two decades of her life. Mallon died after a total of nearly 30 years in isolation. Her popular nickname has since gained currency as a term for persons who spread disease or other misfortune, not always aware that they are doing so.

Biography

Early life
Mary Mallon was born in 1869 in Cookstown, County Tyrone, Ireland. Presumably, she was born with typhoid fever because her mother was infected during pregnancy. At the age of 15, she emigrated from Ireland to the United States. She lived with her aunt and uncle for a time and worked as a maid, but eventually became a cook for affluent families.

Career
From 1900 to 1907, Mallon worked as a cook in the New York City area for eight families, seven of whom contracted typhoid. In 1900, she worked in Mamaroneck, New York, where within two weeks of her employment, residents developed typhoid fever. In 1901, she moved to Manhattan, where members of the family for whom she worked developed fevers and diarrhea. Mallon then went to work for a lawyer and left after seven of the eight people in that household became ill.

In June 1904, she was hired by a prosperous lawyer, Henry Gilsey. Soon four of the seven servants were ill. No members of Gilsey's family were infected because they resided separately, and the servants lived in their own house. Immediately after the outbreak began, Mallon left and moved to Tuxedo Park, where she was hired by George Kessler. Two weeks later, the laundry worker in his household was infected and taken to St. Joseph's Regional Medical Center, where her case of typhoid was the first in a long time. The investigator Dr. R. L. Wilson concluded that the laundry worker had caused the outbreak, but he failed to prove it. The laundry worker died soon after.

In August 1906, Mallon took a position in Oyster Bay on Long Island with the family of a wealthy New York banker, Charles Henry Warren. Mallon went along with the Warrens when they rented a house in Oyster Bay for the summer of 1906. From August 27 to September 3, six of the 11 people in the family came down with typhoid fever. The disease at that time was "unusual" in Oyster Bay, according to three medical doctors who practiced there. The landlord, understanding that it would be impossible to rent a house with the reputation of typhoid, hired several independent experts to find the source of infection. They took water samples from pipes, faucets, toilets, and the cesspool, all of which were negative for typhoid.

In late 1906, Mallon was hired by Walter Bowen, whose family lived on Park Avenue. Their maid fell sick on January 23, 1907, and soon two of the household's servants had been hospitalized and the daughter of the house had contracted typhoid and died.

Investigation 

George Soper, an investigator hired by the Oyster Bay property owner after the outbreak there, had been trying to determine the cause of typhoid outbreaks in well-to-do families, when it was known that the disease typically struck in unsanitary conditions. He discovered that a female Irish cook, who fit the physical description he had been given, was involved in all of the outbreaks. He was unable to locate her because she generally left after an outbreak began, without giving a forwarding address. The Park Avenue outbreak helped to identify Mallon as the source of the infections. Soper learned of the case while it was still active and discovered Mallon was the cook.

Soper first met Mallon in the kitchen of the Bowens' Park Avenue penthouse and accused her of spreading the disease. Though Soper himself recollected his behavior "as diplomatic as possible", he infuriated Mallon and she threatened him with a carving fork. When Mallon refused to give samples, Soper decided to compile a five-year history of her employment. He found that, of the eight families that had hired Mallon as a cook, members of seven claimed to have contracted typhoid fever. Then Soper found out where Mallon's boyfriend lived and arranged a new meeting there. He took Dr. Raymond Hoobler in an attempt to persuade Mary to give them samples of urine and stool for analysis. Mallon again refused to cooperate, believing that typhoid was everywhere and that the outbreaks had happened because of contaminated food and water. At that time, the concept of healthy carriers was unknown even to healthcare workers.

Soper published his findings on June 15, 1907, in the Journal of the American Medical Association. He wrote:

It was found that the family changed cooks on August 4. This was about three weeks before the typhoid epidemic broke out. The new cook, Mallon, remained in the family only a short time and left about three weeks after the outbreak occurred. Mallon was described as an Irish woman about 40 years of age, tall, heavy, single. She seemed to be in perfect health.

First quarantine (1907–1910) 

Soper notified the New York City Health Department, whose investigators realized that Mallon was a typhoid carrier. Under sections 1169 and 1170 of the Greater New York Charter, Mallon was arrested as a public health threat. She was forced into an ambulance by five policemen and Dr. Josephine Baker, who at some point had to sit on Mallon to restrain her. Mallon was transported to the Willard Parker Hospital, where she was restrained and forced to give samples. For four days, she was not allowed to get up and use the bathroom on her own. The massive numbers of typhoid bacteria that were discovered in her stool samples indicated that the infection center was in her gallbladder. Under questioning, Mallon admitted that she almost never washed her hands. This was not unusual at the time; the germ theory of disease still was not fully accepted.

On March 19, 1907, Mallon was sentenced to quarantine on North Brother Island. While quarantined, she gave stool and urine samples three times per week. Authorities suggested removing her gallbladder, but she refused because she did not believe she carried the disease. At the time, gallbladder removal was dangerous, and people had died from the procedure. Mallon was also unwilling to stop working as a cook, a job that earned more money for her than any other. Having no home of her own, she was always on the verge of poverty.

After the publication of Soper's article in the Journal of the American Medical Association, Mallon attracted extensive media attention and received the nickname "Typhoid Mary".  Later, in a textbook that defined typhoid fever, she again was called "Typhoid Mary".

Soper visited Mallon in quarantine, telling her he would write a book and give her part of the royalties. She angrily rejected his proposal and locked herself in the bathroom until he left. She hated the nickname and wrote in a letter to her lawyer:
I wonder how the said Dr. William H. Park would like to be insulted and put in the Journal and call him or his wife Typhoid William Park.

Not all medical experts supported the decision to forcibly quarantine Mallon. For example, Milton J. Rosenau and Charles V. Chapin both argued that she just had to be taught to carefully treat her condition and ensure that she would not transmit the typhoid to others. Both considered isolation to be an unnecessary, overly strict punishment. Mallon suffered from a nervous breakdown after her arrest and forcible transportation to the hospital. In 1909, she tried to sue the New York Health Department, but her complaint was denied and the case closed by the New York Supreme Court. In a letter to her lawyer, she complained that she was treated like a "guinea pig". She was obliged to give samples for analysis three times a week, but for six months was not allowed to visit an eye doctor, even though her eyelid was paralyzed and she had to bandage it at night. Her medical treatment was hectic: she was given urotropin in three-month courses for a year, threatening to destroy her kidneys. That was changed to brewer's yeast and hexamethylenamin in increasing doses. She was first told that she had typhoid in her intestinal tract, then in her bowel muscles, then in her gallbladder.

Mallon herself never believed that she was a carrier. With the help of a friend, she sent several samples to an independent New York laboratory. All came back negative for typhoid. On North Brother Island, almost a quarter of her analyses from March 1907 through June 1909 were also negative. After 2 years and 11 months of Mallon's quarantine, Eugene H. Porter, the New York State Commissioner of Health, decided that disease carriers should no longer be kept in isolation and that Mallon could be freed if she agreed to stop working as a cook and take reasonable steps to avoid transmitting typhoid to others. On February 19, 1910, Mallon said she was "prepared to change her occupation (that of a cook), and would give assurance by affidavit that she would upon her release take such hygienic precautions as would protect those with whom she came in contact, from infection." She was released from quarantine and returned to the mainland.

Release and second quarantine (1915–1938)

Upon her release, Mallon was given a job as a laundry worker, which paid less than cooking—$20 per month instead of $50. At some point, she wounded her arm and the wound became infected, meaning that she could not work at all for six months. After several unsuccessful years, she started cooking again. She used fake surnames like Breshof or Brown, and took jobs as a cook against the explicit instructions of health authorities. No agencies that hired servants for upscale families would offer her employment, so for the next five years, she moved to the mass sector. She worked in a number of kitchens in restaurants, hotels, and spa centers. Almost everywhere she worked, there were outbreaks of typhoid. However, she changed jobs frequently, and Soper was unable to find her.

In 1915, Mallon started working at Sloane Hospital for Women in New York City. Soon 25 people were infected, and two died. The head obstetrician, Dr. Edward B. Cragin, called Soper and asked him to help in the investigation. Soper identified Mallon from the servants' verbal descriptions and also by her handwriting.

Mallon again fled, but the police were able to find and arrest her when she took food to a friend on Long Island. Mallon was returned to quarantine on North Brother Island on March 27, 1915.

Little is known about her life during the second quarantine. She remained on North Brother for more than 23 years, and the authorities gave her a private one-story cottage. As of 1918, she was allowed to take day trips to the mainland. In 1925, Dr. Alexandra Plavska came to the island for an internship. She organized a laboratory on the second floor of the chapel and offered Mallon a job as a technician. Mallon washed bottles, did recordings, and prepared glasses for pathologists.

Media reception 
After Mallon was sent into her initial quarantine, the newspapers changed their opinion on her case. The articles at first talked about how Dr. Josephine Baker claimed Mallon attacked her and the other doctors with forks, and came at them fighting and swearing. Later on the press articles shifted the blame from fully her fault to the opposite stance, the belief that she was unaware she was carrying anything and instead germs that she had no control over were to blame.  The newspapers also claimed that Mallon was barred from using the telephone to contact anybody except the surgeons treating her and her guard. Stories that once celebrated the public health department and legal system eventually became sympathetic to Mallon and the events she supposedly encountered. Public health officials claim the opposite, that she was treated to their best ability but in return refused to comply with the requests of the health officials.

Death 
Mallon spent the rest of her life in quarantine at Riverside Hospital on North Brother Island. Mallon was quite active until suffering a stroke in 1932; afterwards, she was confined to the hospital. She never completely recovered, and half of her body remained paralyzed. On November 11, 1938, she died of pneumonia at age 69. Mallon's body was cremated, and her ashes were buried at Saint Raymond's Cemetery in the Bronx. Nine people attended the funeral.

Some sources claim that a post-mortem autopsy found evidence of live typhoid bacteria in Mallon's gallbladder. Soper wrote, however, that there was no autopsy, a claim cited by other researchers to assert a conspiracy to calm public opinion after her death.

Legacy

Aftermath 
Mallon's case became the first in which an asymptomatic carrier was discovered and forcibly isolated. The ethical and legal issues raised by her case are still discussed. Research has led to an estimate that Mallon had contaminated "at least one hundred and twenty two people, including five dead". Other sources attribute at least three deaths to contact with Mallon, but because of health officials' inability to persuade her to cooperate, the exact number is not known. Some have estimated that contact with her may have caused 50 fatalities.

In a 2013 article in the Annals of Gastroenterology, the authors concluded:

Two scholarly sources combined to provide this conclusion:

Other healthy typhoid carriers identified in the first quarter of the 20th century include Tony Labella, an Italian immigrant, presumed to have caused over 100 cases (with five deaths); an Adirondack guide dubbed "Typhoid John", presumed to have infected 36 people (with two deaths); and Alphonse Cotils, a restaurateur and bakery owner.

The health technology of the era did not have a completely effective solution: there were no antibiotics to fight the infection, and gallbladder removal was a dangerous, sometimes fatal operation. Some modern specialists claim that typhoid bacteria can become integrated in macrophages and then reside in intestinal lymph nodes or the spleen.

Ethics 
The ethical question of her arrest and forced quarantine asks if there was a justification for arresting her and isolating her from the world. The answer to this question is complex and is still being debated. Historians frequently bring up the argument of Mallon knowing she was infecting her clients with typhoid based on the frequency of the disease being present after her departure. They also cite the argument that antibiotics did not exist at this time and ten percent of those affected by Mallon carrying the infection died. This argument could also potentially view Mallon as a murderer of those ten percent of people if she knew she was a carrier of the disease, and would be a justification for her arrest.

Others argue that Mallon did not know that she had the bacteria and therefore did not deserve to be arrested when she never committed a crime. At the time, asymptomatic carriers were not understood and Mallon was believed to have said that she did not feel sick, look sick, or have any sort of visible sickness. Although Mallon did not feel ill or look sick, the disease was living dormant in what was assumed to be her gallbladder.

Lessons learned 

Mallon was the first individual who was found to be an asymptomatic carrier of the typhoid bacterium, and this caused the health officials to have little to no idea of how to deal with someone in her position. However, Mallon's case helped these officials identify other people who carried diseases that were dormant in their bodies based on the information they learned from Mallon's case. Mallon's case created a shift in emphasis around the understanding of personhood and social responsibility. It also was the case that led scientists to shift the idea of the asymptomatic carrier from an idea to an evidence-backed scientific study.

In culture 

Today, the phrase "Typhoid Mary" is a colloquial term for anyone who, knowingly or not, spreads disease or some other undesirable thing.

Typhoid Mary Fisk, also known as Bloody Mary and Mutant Zero, is a supervillain appearing in American comic books published by Marvel Comics.

Mallon's urban legend status in New York inspired the name of the rap group Hail Mary Mallon.

Mallon was portrayed by Melissa McMeekin in season one of The Knick, in a somewhat fictionalised account of her initial infection of countless wealthy households.

Mallon's butcher knife featured as an artifact in season three of Warehouse 13. Associated with Mallon's legacy with disease, the fictional artifact had the ability to transfer illness between individuals holding the knife simultaneously.

References

Sources

Further reading 
 
 
 
 
 Federspiel, Jürg.  The Ballad of Typhoid Mary (historical novel translated by Joel Agee). New York: Ballantine Books, 1985.

See also 
 Superspreader

External links 

 

1869 births
1938 deaths
19th-century Irish people
20th-century Irish people
Deaths from pneumonia in New York (state)
American domestic workers
Index cases
Irish emigrants to the United States (before 1923)
People from Cookstown
People from Oyster Bay (town), New York
Typhoid fever
Women and death
Burials at Saint Raymond's Cemetery (Bronx)